Yesterday's Wife is a 1923 American silent comedy-drama film directed by Edward LeSaint and starring Irene Rich, Eileen Percy, and Lottie Williams.

Plot
As described in a film magazine review, following a mutual misunderstanding, a divorce decree parts Gilbert and Megan Armes. She becomes a companion to an old lady while Gilbert weds Viola, who is frivolous and a flirt. Megan and her former husband meet years later at a fashionable resort and find that they are still in love with each other. Viola is drowned in a boating accident. Megan and Gilbert re-marry.

Cast

Preservation
With no prints of Yesterday's Wife located in any film archives, it is a lost film.

References

Bibliography
 Munden, Kenneth White. The American Film Institute Catalog of Motion Pictures Produced in the United States, Part 1. University of California Press, 1997.

External links

1923 films
1923 comedy-drama films
Films directed by Edward LeSaint
American silent feature films
American black-and-white films
Columbia Pictures films
1920s English-language films
1920s American films
Silent American comedy-drama films